, is a mountain on the border between Fukuoka Prefecture and Ōita Prefecture in Kyūshū, Japan. It has an elevation of 1,200 metres. 

It is an important site for Shugendo, and a famous place for rock climbing. It is supposed Miyamoto Musashi stayed there in order to train after surviving the Toyotomi clan defeat at Sekigahara.

See also
Hikosan Jingū

External links

Hiko
Hiko